Boulenophrys lini is a species of frogs in the family Megophryidae. It is endemic to Luoxiao Mountains at the border of the Jiangxi and Hunan provinces in southeastern China. Its specific name honours professor Ying Lin (1914–2003), botanist and vice chancellor of Nanchang University who conducted biodiversity surveys and research in the Jinggang Mountains.

Description
Males measure  and females  in snout–vent length. Snout is short. Dorsal skin is smooth and has scattered granules, and usually, a few curved weak ridges. There is a small, horn-like tubercle at the edge of the eyelid as well as several tubercles on the flanks. Supratympanic fold is narrow and light coloured. Dorsal colour is light brown or olive. There is a dark, triangular interorbital marking, and an X-shaped dorsal marking with light bordering. Ventral surfaces are smooth. Hind legs are elongated; toes have rudimentary webbing.

Males have tiny, black nuptial spines on the middle of the dorsal surface of the first finger and a single vocal sack. They call both day and night. Reproductive season is assumed to start in September–October.

Body is slender and horizontally compressed, with dorsal fin than is slightly higher than the body. Oral disk is terminal with expanded and upward-directed lips.

Distribution and habitat
This newly described species is known from a number of locations on the Luoxiao Mountains: Dabali and Niushiping in the Yanling Taoyuandong National Nature Reserve, Hunan, and Jingzhushan, Bamianshan (the type locality), and Nanfengmian Nature Reserve in Jiangxi. It lives along rushing mountain streams surrounded by subtropical moist evergreen broadleaf forests at elevations of  asl. Tadpoles have been found under rocks in a stream.

Two other Boulenophrys species occur in the area, but the three species differ in their habitats: Boulenophrys jinggangensis lives in slow-moving streams at  asl, and Boulenophrys cheni in swamps at forest edges at  asl. The species also differ in the characteristics of the male advertisement calls.

References

lini
Amphibians described in 2014
Frogs of Asia
Amphibians of China
Endemic fauna of China